The Protecting the Right to Organize Act, or PRO Act, is a proposed United States law that would amend previous labor laws such as the National Labor Relations Act, for the purpose of expanding "various labor protections related to employees' rights to organize and collectively bargain in the workplace". It would prevent employers from holding mandatory meetings for the purpose of counteracting labor organization, and would strengthen the legal right of employees to join a labor union. The bill would also permit labor unions to encourage secondary strikes. The PRO Act would weaken "right-to-work" laws, which exist in 27 U.S. states. It would allow the National Labor Relations Board to fine employers for violations of labor law, and would provide compensation to employees involved in such cases.

Background 
The Protecting the Right to Organize Act, also known as the PRO Act, follows a series of past legislation passed by Congress concerning labor rights. A number of landmark bills were passed during the New Deal period, including the Fair Labor Standards Act of 1938, which President Franklin D. Roosevelt considered one of the most important Acts of Congress at the time.

Following the New Deal, a number of bills were passed which restricted the activities of labor unions. Among these was the Labor Management Relations Act of 1947 (commonly known as the Taft-Hartley Act), which among other things prohibited secondary boycotts and closed shops.

In 2009, the Employee Free Choice Act, another bill which would have amended the National Labor Relations Act, failed to pass.

In the State of California, following the passage of California Assembly Bill 5, Proposition 22 was passed in 2020. Proposition 22 was intended to classify so-called gig workers for app-based companies (such as Lyft, Uber, DoorDash and Postmates) as "independent contractors" rather than full employees.

Content 
The PRO Act would amend the National Labor Relations Act of 1935 (also known as the Wagner Act), the Taft-Hartley Act, and the Labor-Management Reporting and Disclosure Act of 1959 (also known as the Landrum–Griffin Act).

According to the summary text of the PRO Act, it revises definitions under labor law, permits labor unions to encourage participation in secondary strikes, and prohibits employers from litigating against unions which conduct such secondary strikes:Among other things, it (1) revises the definitions of employee, supervisor, and employer to broaden the scope of individuals covered by the fair labor standards; (2) permits labor organizations to encourage participation of union members in strikes initiated by employees represented by a different labor organization (i.e., secondary strikes); and (3) prohibits employers from bringing claims against unions that conduct such secondary strikes.The PRO Act would prevent employees seeking to join a labor union from being fired. It would allow unions to override "right-to-work laws", allowing labor unions to collect dues from all employees in a workplace, regardless of whether or not they are a member of a labor union. Right-to-work laws exist in 27 U.S. states, and the PRO Act would weaken these laws. It would also prohibit company-sponsored captive audience meetings used to counteract and discourage attempts at labor organization as an unfair labor practice. It prevents an employer from holding citizenship status against an employee. The bill would allow the National Labor Relations Board to fine employers up to $50,000 for every violation of labor law. It would also allow the NLRB to fine employers up to $100,000 in the case of repeat offenses by an employer. It would bring monetary compensation to employees involved in such cases. The PRO Act would classify some workers who are classified now as "independent contractors", instead as "employees". The bill would amend the National Labor Relations Act to define an employee as follows:"An individual performing any service shall be considered an employee (except as provided in the previous sentence) and not an independent contractor, unless—

"(A) the individual is free from control and direction in connection with the performance of the service, both under the contract for the performance of service and in fact;

"(B) the service is performed outside the usual course of the business of the employer; and

"(C) the individual is customarily engaged in an independently established trade, occupation, profession, or business of the same nature as that involved in the service performed."This definitional amendment would allow for certain workers, such as those working in the gig economy, to attain the right to form a labor union or to bargain collectively. This would potentially include those who work for app-based companies such as Uber, DoorDash, or Lyft, and overall could include hundreds of thousands or millions of workers. However, this reclassification applies only to collective bargaining. For other considerations, such as wages or benefits, they would still be treated as independent contractors. The PRO Act would alter union election rules. For example, it would allow unions to hold elections through mail ballots or electronic ballots. The bill would allow for workers to sue employers, and would make it easier for employees to join a union.

Support and opposition

Polling 
A poll conducted by Vox and Data for Progress in June 2021 said that 59% of likely U.S. voters supported the PRO Act, and 29% opposed it.

Support 
A letter signed by over 100 labor unions, advocacy organizations, churches, and political groups supported the PRO Act. This included but was not limited to the AFL-CIO, EPI, Public Citizen, AFT, Sunrise Movement, CPD, DSA, SEIU, PFAW, CWA, FSP, FoEI, HRW, USW, IWPR, GBCS, IFPTE, NETWORK, Patriotic Millionaires, and Oxfam. Ryan Kekeris, an organizer with the International Union of Painters and Allied Trades, said the PRO Act "modernizes and updates a lot of the loopholes and the brokenness of U.S. labor law". Richard Trumka of the AFL-CIO said, "If you really want to correct inequality in this country ... passing the PRO Act is absolutely essential to doing that." The bill has received backing from the Labor Caucus and The Leadership Conference on Civil and Human Rights. Joe Biden endorsed the PRO Act, and has called labor law reform one of the top priorities of his administration.

Opposition 
At least 150 business groups oppose the PRO Act. Those who oppose it, including Republicans, business groups, and industry groups, have variously said the PRO Act would hurt business and workers, violate privacy rights, give unions too much bargaining power, enable corruption, and would disrespect states' rights. The U.S. Chamber of Commerce, a business-oriented lobby group, opposes the PRO Act. Among other opposed organizations are the NRF, NAM, National Restaurant Association, American Hotel & Lodging Association, NFIB, and the NAHB.

Legislative activity

116th Congress 
On May 2, 2019, Rep. Robert C Scott (D-VA) introduced H.R. 2474, the Protecting the Right to Organize Act of 2019, in the House of Representatives. It had 218 cosponsors. The bill passed in the House of Representatives by a vote of 224 to 194 on May 6, 2020. Seven House Democrats voted against the bill.

On May 2, 2019, Sen. Patty Murray (D-WA) introduced S.1306, the Protecting the Right to Organize Act of 2019, in the Senate. It was referred to the Committee on Health, Education, Labor, and Pensions. The bill had 41 cosponsors.

117th Congress 
On February 4, 2021, Rep. Bobby Scott (D-VA-03) introduced the Protecting the Right to Organize Act of 2021 in the House of Representatives. Of the bill's 213 cosponsors, 3 – Brian Fitzpatrick (PA-01), Jeff Van Drew (NJ-02), and Chris Smith (NJ-04) – were Republicans; the other 210 were Democrats.

The bill passed in the House of Representatives by a vote of 225 to 206 on March 9, 2021. Five House Republicans (Brian Fitzpatrick, John Katko, Chris Smith, Jeff Van Drew, and Don Young) joined the House Democrats in voting for it, while one Democrat (Henry Cuellar) voted against it. The bill now advances to the U.S. Senate; however, the bill is unlikely to pass as it would require universal Democratic support and 10 Republican crossover votes to pass in case of a filibuster.

118th Congress 
On February 28, 2023, Rep. Bobby Scott (D-VA-03) introduced the Richard L. Trumka Protecting the Right to Organize Act of 2023 in the House of Representatives.

Legislative history 
As of March 8, 2023:

See also 
 Fair Labor Standards Act of 1938
 Adamson Act
 Paycheck Fairness Act
 Employee Free Choice Act
 Labor unions in the United States

References

External links 

 H.R. 2474: Protecting the Right to Organize Act of 2019 on GovTrack

 S.1306: Protecting the Right to Organize Act of 2019 on GovTrack

 H.R. 842: Protecting the Right to Organize Act of 2021 on GovTrack

Proposed legislation of the 116th United States Congress
Proposed legislation of the 117th United States Congress
United States proposed federal labor legislation